Ivanjše is a small settlement in the foothills of the Gorjanci Hills in the Municipality of Kostanjevica na Krki in eastern Slovenia. The area is part of the traditional region of Lower Carniola. It is now included in the Lower Sava Statistical Region.

There is a small chapel-shrine in the southern part of the settlement. It is dedicated to the Virgin Mary and was built in the early 20th century.

References

External links
Ivanjše on Geopedia

Populated places in the Municipality of Kostanjevica na Krki